Athletes is a 1925 German silent film directed by Frederic Zelnik and starring Asta Nielsen, Gregori Chmara and Arnold Korff.

The film's sets were designed by the art director Alfred Junge.

Cast

References

Bibliography

External links

1925 films
Films of the Weimar Republic
Films directed by Frederic Zelnik
German silent feature films
German black-and-white films
Phoebus Film films